The Kings Theatre is a theatre in Southsea, Portsmouth, designed by the architect Frank Matcham. It opened on 30 September 1907. It is operated by the Kings Theatre Trust Ltd. The building was designated a Grade II* listed building in 1976.

History

The theatre opened on 30 September 1907 with a production of Charles I followed by two further of Sir Henry Irving's Works. During the 1930s it was used to premiere several works by Ian Hay before they transferred to the West End including Orders Are Orders and Admirals All. The musical This'll Make You Whistle premiered there in 1935.

The theatre stayed in the control of its original owners, The Portsmouth Theatre Company, until 1964 when it was purchased by Commander Reggie & Mrs Joan Cooper. In 1990 it was sold again to Hampshire County Council. In 2001, after a successful campaign by AKTER (Action for Kings Theatre Restoration) to keep the theatre open, the theatre was purchased by Portsmouth City Council and leased to the Kings Theatre Trust Ltd who undertook the restoration of the building. The present day theatre has a seating capacity of 1600 and a computerised booking system. Much of the backstage area is still fully manual, allowing it to retain the tag of a traditional hemp house, though powered flying bars have now been installed to allow large-scale productions.

In 1974, director Ken Russell filmed the Pinball Wizard sequence of the rock opera Tommy at the theatre, featuring The Who and Elton John on the stage.

The Kings Theatre Trust Ltd

The Kings Theatre Trust Ltd. is a registered charity which oversees both the day-to-day running and the restoration of the building, as well as productions at the theatre. The restoration is in part funded by Portsmouth City Council and the Kings Theatre Trust.

Staff
Led by a team of Directors headed up by Chair of Directors, Paul Woolf, the permanent staff are augmented by apprenticeships and seconded personal who are employed as part of their higher education and vocational training programmes as well as casual staff.  The Kings prides itself in the educational and training programmes available to young people in the Portsmouth area.

Restoration work
As part of the Centenary Project, the Kings Theatre underwent a £500,000 refurbishment of the auditorium, including the ceiling. Beginning on 17 June 2007 the theatre was cleared and scaffolding was constructed to allow access to the higher areas of the auditorium. There was work to restore the decorations of the theatre and maintain the areas. During this work a small 120-seat theatre was created within the auditorium which was known as the Stage 2 Studio. The Studio season was such a success that it was repeated during the Summer of 2008 (throughout August) with music, comedy, children's shows, drama and dance all part of the line up.

Between October 2008 and February 2009, the original leaded dome, red painted wooden cupula, the deteriorated wooden statue (now named Aurora) and six lion figures was replicated in glassfibre by Jago Developments of Chichester and successfully installed by them (with the help of a 60-ton crane).

Since the restoration programme commenced, over £2 million has been spent on refurbishment using both professional and volunteer workers.

The Kings Theatre Trust are in the process of raising funds for a restoration of the currently dilapidated Tower Room, to create a community art studio and exhibition space.

Shows

Many one night touring shows come to the Kings Theatre, from ballet to rock music, through drama to children's shows.

Since the major restorations have been undertaken, the Kings Theatre has attracted large national touring productions such as "Chicago", "Beauty & The Beast", "MAMMA MIA!", "The Rocky Horror Show", "Evita" and "Grease".

The theatre is also host to many local drama societies including The Portsmouth Players, CCADs and South Downe Musical Society.

Professional Productions

 The Sound of Music
 Mamma Mia!
 We Will Rock You
 The Play That Goes Wrong
 Avenue Q
 Grease
 Chicago
 Dreamboats and Petticoats
 Joseph and the Amazing Technicolor Dreamcoat
 Buddy
 The Mousetrap
 Seven Brides for Seven Brothers
 Copacabana
 The Woman in Black (25th Anniversary Touring Production)
 Calamity Jane
 Return to the Forbidden Planet (25th Anniversary Tour)
 The History Boys
 Hair

References

External links
 Kings Theatre Official site

Theatres in Hampshire
Buildings and structures in Portsmouth
Grade II* listed buildings in Hampshire
Tourist attractions in Portsmouth
1907 establishments in England